Elachista albrechti is a moth in the family Elachistidae. It was described by Lauri Kaila in 1998. It is found in Nepal.

References

Moths described in 1998
albrechti
Moths of Asia
Taxa named by Lauri Kaila